The COVID-19 pandemic was confirmed to have reached the U.S. state of Ohio on March 9, 2020, when the state's first cases were reported. The first death from COVID-19 in Ohio was reported on March 19. Subsequently, records supported by further testing showed that undetected cases had existed in Ohio since early January, with the first confirmed death on March 17. By April 23, Ohio had 656 confirmed deaths; by May 1, there were 1002 confirmed deaths. Accurate data was difficult to obtain due to limited test availability. By December 12, a total of 553,461 cases had been reported leading to 31,803 hospitalizations and 7,477 deaths.

, Ohio has administered at least one dose of COVID-19 vaccine to 7,575,856 people, or 64.81% of the population, completed vaccination for 7,023,701 people, or 60.09% of the population, and administered first booster to 3,984,254 people, second booster doses to 1,788,857 people, and updated boosters to 1,815,402 people. , the state department of health reported 88,038 hospitalizations and 26,749 deaths since January 1, 2021, among individuals not reported as fully vaccinated, and 6,632 hospitalizations and 1,499 deaths among fully vaccinated individuals in the same time period.

Spread of virus

2020

March 
On March 9, Governor Mike DeWine reported Ohio's first 3 cases in Cuyahoga County, a couple who had returned from a Nile River cruise, and a man who had returned from an annual conference in Washington, D.C., where other cases of coronavirus had been reported. Two days later, a fourth case, and the first instance of community spread, was confirmed by DeWine in Stark County. Later tests showed the first case was February 15.

By March 13, there were a total of 13 cases, with 159 others under observation. Within a week the first death was announced. Mark Wagoner, Sr, a prominent Toledo attorney and friend of DeWine, died March 19. Later tests showed the first coronavirus death had been March 17.

By March 23, there were a cumulative 442 COVID-19 cases, 6 of which resulted in death. By April 5 there were 4,043 cases, 1,104 hospitalizations including 346 ICU admissions, and 119 deaths. As of April 9, twenty percent of cases involved healthcare workers. By April 13 there were 6,975 cases, 2,033 hospitalizations including 613 ICU admissions, and 274 deaths.

April 
On April 14, Ohio had an additional 50 deaths for a total of 324.

By April 14, Ohio was expecting the peak to happen on April 19.

By April 17, the state had 9,107 confirmed and probable cases including 418 confirmed and probable deaths. On the 25th the number of cases reached 15,587 and the number of deaths reached 711.
By April 28 Ohio had 16,769 cases, 3,340 hospitalizations including 1,004 ICU admissions, and 799 deaths. On April 28, Vinton County first had cases reported to the state, so all 88 counties in Ohio had confirmed cases. By May 4, there were 20,474 cases reported, including 1,056 deaths.

On April 23, nearly 80% of inmates tested positive at two overcrowded Ohio prisons. At Marion Correctional Institution, there were 2,011 infected inmates and 157 infected workers, with two inmate and one worker deaths. At Pickaway Correctional Institution there were 1,555 infected inmates, 73 infected employees, and ten inmate deaths.

May 
On May 12, Ohio had reached 25,250 total cases, including 1,232 ICU admissions and 1,436 deaths. On May 12, the state department of health noted that antibody tests showed presence of the disease as early as January 7, with positive results in several counties in January.

On May 20, the state announced that 1,247 of 1,781 deaths announced to that date, or 70 percent, were in nursing home or long-term care facilities. By May 26 there had been 33,006 reported cases, leading to 5,579 hospitalizations and 2,002 deaths. 1,450 of the hospitalizations were ICU admissions.

By May 21, in Ohio prisons more than 4,500 inmates had tested positive, with four prison worker and 63 inmate deaths. Mass-testing in prisons had been stopped in late April.

June 
In late June and early July, some counties in Ohio experienced a sharp increase in cases.

July 
On July 4, 91 cases were reported as the result of a 56-year-old man who had attended a church service on June 14 when he was contagious.

On July 22, the City of Cleveland reported 70 new cases among its residents but no new deaths.

August 
On August 6, Governor DeWine said that an infected man who attended a single church service caused an outbreak of 91 COVID-19 cases.

On August 21, Ohio State University issued 228 interim suspensions to students for violations of COVID-19 safety guidelines.

September 
On September 1, Miami University announced plans for testing of all students. Many of the 27 cases reported among athletes had been traced to an off-campus gathering in early August. Between August 17 and September 3, about 704 Miami students had tested positive.

On September 3, Ohio State University reported 882 positive cases among students and 20 positive cases among employees. Off-campus students tested in the previous 24 hours had a 9.66 positivity rate, while on-campus students had a 5.7 percent positivity rate. Further suspensions may be issued for gatherings of ten or more people without masks or social distancing. The University of Dayton announced that the cumulative number of positive cases among on-campus students was 1,042, almost 10% of all students, and included 639 active cases.

On September 20, Ohio State reached 2,580 cumulative positive tests, surpassing the total cases at the Marion Correctional Institution, to become the largest outbreak in the state.

October 
As of October 1, there have been 155,314 reported cases in Ohio, leading to 4,817 deaths. By October 12, there were 170,179 reported cases, leading to 5,005 deaths. By October 16, there were 177,991 reported cases leading to 5,054 deaths.

On October 22, 38 Ohio counties were on red alert for coronavirus spread. Cuyahoga, Clark and Hamilton County were on "watch" for declaration of a purple "public emergency" level, having met the criteria for one out of the two weeks required. By October 22, 190,430 cases were reported in Ohio since the beginning of the pandemic, leading to 5,161 deaths. By October 27, 202,740 cases were reported, leading to 5,239 deaths.
On October 29, the number of new cases recorded in 24 hours topped 3,500 for the first time.  3,845 new cases were reported October 30.

On October 29, Ohio had 3,590 new cases in a 24-hour period. This was the first time the state surpassed 3,000 daily cases, and 25% higher than the record high on the previous Saturday. 43% of Ohio counties, and 78% of Ohio residents were coded "red" for high exposure and spread.

On October 31, the 7-day test positivity rate was 6.9%. Two restaurants in Cleveland were cited for violating health orders with large Halloween gatherings.

November 
By November 2, 221,909 COVID-19 cases had been reported, leading to 5,340 deaths. On November 3, classes were canceled at Clyde High School in Clyde due to several positive cases. By November 4, 230,209 cases had been reported. Those cases have led to 5,428 deaths. The total number of cases surpassed 250,000 on November 8. 7,101 cases were reported on November 12, which was the highest number of cases recorded in a day since Ohio began recording. The record was again broken on November 13, when 8,071 new cases were recorded. By November 19, 326,615 cases had been reported, leading to 5,890 deaths. On November 20, 8,808 cases had been reported in 24 hours. The total number of cases surpassed 350,000 on November 22. On November 23, 11,885 new cases were reported and the number of total deaths caused by the virus surpassed 6,000. The number of deaths reported in 24 hours was 98 on November 24. On November 27, 17,065 new cases were reported for a two-day period after no report for Thanksgiving on November 26. As of November 28, 406,703 total cases had been reported.

December 
By December 1, the number of total cases had increased to 430,093.  By December 6, there were 475,024 total reported cases leading to 6,959 deaths. By December 7, the number of deaths surpassed 7,000. By December 8, the number of total cases reported was 510,018 while the total number of hospitalizations was 30,226. By December 10, a total of 7,298 people in Ohio had died from the virus. By December 12, a total of 553,461 cases had been reported leading to 31,803 hospitalizations and 7,477 deaths. The number of total cases surpassed 600,000 on December 18. On December 19, the total number of deaths surpassed 8,000. As of December 26, 664,668 total cases had been reported. By December 31, 700,380 cases had been reported.

2021

January 
By January 3, 2021, the total number of deaths had increased to 9,076. By January 6, the number of total hospitalizations had increased to 40,104. By January 7, 753,068 total cases had been reported. By January 14, 807,293 cases had been reported, leading to 9,990 deaths. By January 15, the total number of deaths surpassed 10,000. The number of deaths surpassed 11,000 on January 28.

February 
As of February 2, 902,736 total cases had been reported. By February 11, there were 12,577 deaths. By February 12, a total of 15,136 deaths had been reported. By February 13, 16,340 deaths had been reported. In February, the Ohio Department of Health reported that it was reconciling death totals, which caused a fluctuation in numbers over several days. By February 22, 955,378 cases had been reported since the pandemic began. By February 24, the number of deaths caused by the virus was 17,045. By February 26, there were 50,118 hospitalizations.

March 
By March 22, 1,001,194 cases had been reported since the pandemic began.

April 
On April 5, it was reported that there had been 18,643 deaths in the state since the beginning of the pandemic.

May 
By May 19, there were 1,093,534 reported cases and 19,628 deaths. On May 27, the number of total cases surpassed 1,100,000.

June 
On June 5, Governor DeWine announced that the state had fewer than 50 per 100,000 COVID-19 cases in the previous two weeks, subtracting those in jails and prisons. This was the rate previously announced for removal of health orders, which occurred June 2. 
On June 8, the state reported more than 20,000 Ohio residents had died from COVID-19.

July 
As of July 22, a total of 1,120,120 cases had been reported.

August 
As of August 1, a total of 1,130,134 cases had been reported leading to 61,939 hospitalizations. As of August 12, a total of 1,152,590 cases had been reported. 
As of August 20, a total of 1,175,340 cases has been reported. By August 27, the number of cases surpassed 1.2 million.

October 
By October 19, Ohio had surpassed more than 1.5 million total reported cases.

November 
As of  November 4, there had been a total of 1,560,695 cases, leading to 80,615 hospitalizations. As of November 5, there had been 25,067 deaths.

December 
On December 31, the state announced more than two million cases since the beginning of the pandemic.

2022

January 

On January 25, 	a total of 2,520,112 COVID-19 cases had been reported in Ohio.

March 

On March 10, Dr. Bruce Vanderhoff, director of the Ohio Department of Health, announced that daily reporting of COVID-19 data would end Monday, March 14. He said, "The situation is improving and our experience with COVID-19 is [shifting] from a pandemic to endemic state." The plan was to update most statistics on Thursdays.

Spread by age range 

Source: Ohio dashboard, January 12, 2023.Note: all data is preliminary and subject to change as more information is reported

Spread by county

Graphs of statistics by date from the Ohio Department of Health

Cases by date

Deaths by date

Hospital admissions by date

Diagnostic tests by date

Percent test positivity by date

Government response
Acting on advice from Ohio Department of Health Director Amy Acton; Governor DeWine was one of the first state governors to "sound the alarm" about the coronavirus threat, taking action before Ohio had any confirmed cases. Axios called him "among the leading governors in the country sounding the alarm about the threat of the coronavirus." The Washington Post called his and Acton's response "a national guide to the crisis" and "textbook recommendations," pointing out numerous occasions when moves taken by Ohio were soon followed by other states. The Hill said he'd "been one of the most aggressive governors in responding to the pandemic".

Prior to the state having any confirmed cases, on March 3, DeWine made the decision to cancel the Arnold Classic, a move which The Washington Post noted as seeming "radical" at the time. The estimated economic impact for the state was $53 million.

On March 5, when the state still had no confirmed cases, DeWine and Acton held a summit on COVID-19 preparedness for public health officials in the state.

DeWine declared a state of emergency on March 9, when the state had only three known cases. That same day he asked colleges and universities to go to online classes. Within days many colleges and universities had taken steps to comply.

On March 12, DeWine announced that all schools from K-12 would close for a 3-week break, starting March 16; he was the first governor to announce statewide school closings. The Ohio Department of Education updated their guidelines for ensuring schoolchildren received meals, announcing that each district would make independent decisions about providing reduced and free breakfast and lunch to students during the break but encouraging districts to ensure needs were met and stating the department would continue to reimburse districts for meals served during the closure.

Also on March 12, Ohio Department of Health director Amy Acton instituted a ban on gatherings of more than 100, with exemptions for airports, workplaces, restaurants, religious gatherings, weddings and funerals. Despite having only thirteen confirmed cases at the time, Ohio officials were predicting that there were over 100,000 cases in the state. Department of Health director Acton compared the small number of cases to "seeing a star and knowing that light is a moment from the deep past" as she argued for Ohioans to take steps to prevent further infections that could overload the state's hospitals. State Representative Emilia Sykes called Acton "the real MVP of Ohio's coronavirus response."

DeWine and Acton on March 14 recommended Ohioans postpone elective surgeries.

DeWine and Acton ordered the closure of all bars and restaurants starting 9:00 PM EDT March 15, 2020, saying the government "encouraged restaurants to offer carryout or delivery service" but that they "would not be allowed to have people congregating in the businesses." DeWine said he was "concerned that with St. Patrick's Day coming up Tuesday, people would ignore warnings and go out to bars." Closing of the state's estimated 22,000 restaurants was expected to affect some 500,000 workers. DeWine instituted a liquor buyback program and expanded Ohio's unemployment insurance to cover laid-off restaurant workers. The state waived the qualifying waiting period as well as the requirement that individuals receiving jobless benefits must seek new employment. The action also was extended to workers who are under quarantine or those who work in health care. DeWine announced his intention to close daycares and recommended parents remove their children from daycare if possible.

DeWine said of the closings:

Acton stressed the importance of "flattening the curve", saying:

On March 16, DeWine banned gatherings of more than 50 people and on March 17 he ordered that all elective surgeries be postponed; controversially, the state government indicated that this included abortions. On March 18, DeWine announced that 181 BMV locations will close until further notice. Five will stay open to process commercial driver license applications and renewal. DeWine asked the state legislature to pass a grace period for people whose licenses expired. Barbershops, salons, and tattoo parlors closed. Businesses that do stay open will have to take every employee's temperature every day before they start work and send anyone with a temperature over 100.4F home; DeWine warned that if businesses did not comply he would close all nonessential businesses. Mayor Andrew Ginther declared a state of emergency in Columbus, Ohio.

On March 19 Governor DeWine signed state active duty proclamation that will activate 300 personnel from the Ohio National Guard, as well as a contingent of Ohio Military Reserve personnel, to help with humanitarian efforts. On March 20 DeWine ordered senior citizens centers to close by March 23. The next day he closed adult day services serving more than ten people at a time, saying he had delayed closing them until ensuring provision had been made to care for those served in them.

On March 22, Acton issued a statewide stay-at-home order to take effect from midnight on March 23 through April 6, requiring the closure of nonessential businesses. DeWine ordered most childcare facilities to close beginning March 26. The State of Ohio Board of Pharmacy approved restrictions on the dispensing of chloroquine and hydroxychloroquine to treat COVID-19.

DeWine said that because of the economic fallout from the closures, the state would need to slow down the rate of spending...rather dramatically," announcing on March 23 a hiring freeze for the state, a freeze on new contract services, and a continuation of the freeze on state employee travel. He asked cabinet members to find budget cuts of 20%. According to Lieutenant Governor Jon Husted, Ohio would at the request of the Trump administration desist from publicizing unemployment figures.

On March 24 Jim Bridenstine announced that a number of NASA facilities would be moved to stage 4 where non-critical infrastructure is closed, including the Glenn Research Center in Cleveland, and the Plum Brook Station near Sandusky.

Acton on March 24 estimated that Ohio was 7 to 14 days behind New York state, which at the time was overwhelmed. On March 26 Acton announced that 17, 316 Ohioans had been tested. On March 27 Acton said the state was at that time expecting cases to peak in mid-May at 10,000 new cases per day.

On March 25, the Ohio General Assembly passed House Bill 197, which does many things, such as extending primary voting to April 28, banning water utilities from disconnecting service, and waiving standardized testing for public schools.

On March 28, DeWine asked the FDA to issue an emergency waiver for the use of new technology that can sterilize face masks.

On April 2, Governor DeWine announced during his daily press conference that there is a new method to divide the state into hospital capacity regions.

On April 3, DeWine extended Ohio's stay at home order through May 1 with new restrictions: campgrounds must close, all retail businesses must post signs limiting how many are allowed in at one time, and wedding receptions are limited to 10 people. The order also establishes a state board to evaluate what is and is not an essential business.

On April 4 Ohio recommended the wearing of cloth face masks when leaving home as a way to protect others. DeWine signed an executive order removing training requirements for mental health and marriage counselors to make telehealth visits more easily accessible.

On April 6 DeWine named six facilities that will be converted into health care facilities if necessary: the Dayton Convention Center, the Duke Energy Center in Cincinnati, the Greater Columbus Convention Center, Seagate Convention Center in Toledo, Case Western Reserve University's Health Education Campus in Cleveland, and the Covelli Convention Center in Youngstown. Also on April 6, Ohio House Speaker Larry Householder named 24 lawmakers to a task force dedicated to studying how the House can speed up economic recovery.

On April 9 the Ohio Department of Health released a video demonstrating the effect of social distancing that went viral. According to The Washington Post:

On April 15, DeWine announced that he had asked the Ohio Hospital Association to begin developing a plan to start treating people whose non-COVID-19 elective procedures were deferred or delayed. DeWine also announced that Ohio's partnership with the Battelle Memorial Institute was expanding. This will allow the institute to extend its sterilization services to EMS providers and law enforcement agencies. On April 16 DeWine announced that he would work closely with the Governors of Illinois, Indiana, Kentucky, Michigan, Minnesota, and Wisconsin to reopen the region's economy in a coordinated way.

The Ohio Department of Health establishes a tier system to prioritize testing on April 22. Ohio: DeWine shares additional details on how the state will re-open. Phase one of the re-opening will begin on May 1.

On April 20, Governor DeWine announced that Ohio's K-12 schools would remain closed for the remainder of the academic year.

On April 30 DeWine and Acton amended the stay-at-home order and extended it to May 29, calling it the "Stay Safe Order." Some businesses were allowed to open on a limited basis, including dentists and veterinarians on May 1, manufacturing, distribution, construction, and general offices on May 4, with remote work if possible, and retail businesses on May 12 with employees and customers wearing masks.

On May 19 Governor DeWine announced an "Urgent Health Advisory: Ohioans protecting Ohioans" order. Elements of the previous stay-at-home order became "strong recommendations." The following day DeWine announced that three new orders had been signed. One order partially rescinds the April 30 Stay Safe Ohio Order, one issue a series of health advisories, and the Camp Safe Ohio Order specifies how campgrounds in Ohio can reopen.

On June 18, DeWine expressed concern about a spike in cases in southwestern Ohio and suggested that people in 13 specific zipcodes (within 5 counties: Hamilton, Montgomery, Greene, Warren, and Clark) should get tested. He said National Guard units would be in the area to provide help with the testing.

On July 2, a four-level system was introduced for classifying the severity of outbreaks in individual counties. The system is based on seven metrics, including new cases and cases per-capita, cases in "non-congregate" environments, ICU bed occupancy, and sustained increases in hospital admissions. These classifications are updated on Wednesdays; as of its introduction, seven counties (Butler, Cuyahoga, Franklin, Hamilton, Huron, Montgomery, and Trumbull counties) were listed in alert level 3, while Franklin County was marked as being at risk of entering alert level 4 — meaning that at least six of the metrics were showing signs of concern.

On July 8, DeWine announced that the wearing of face coverings in public would become mandatory in any county that is under alert level 3 or higher. This order applies in any enclosed public spaces, outdoors when social distancing is not possible, or when using public or private transport services. On July 22, DeWine announced that this mask mandate would be extended state-wide beginning July 23 at 6:00 p.m.

In October, DeWine announced the formation of COVID-19 defense teams to fight the pandemic in each county. The teams are made of those in the medical field, mayors, religious leaders, and businesses. On November 11, DeWine announced additions to the mask mandate, which include requiring businesses to post face covering requirement signs at all public entrances. A new order pertaining to public gatherings prohibits dancing and games and requires people to be seated and wear masks while eating.
On November 16, DeWine announced that he opposed a second shutdown, instead favoring a "slow down." "We don't want to shut this state down," said DeWine. "That has ramifications for mental health, it has ramifications for more drug addiction, overdoses. I mean, all these things go up when you shut the state down. And we do not want to do that." A formal announcement on the slowdown was on Tuesday, November 17. In the announcement, DeWine gave information on a new curfew, requiring retail businesses to close between 10:00 pm and 5:00 am. During these hours, people in Ohio are supposed to stay at home, with certain exceptions, such as seeking medical treatment and going to work. The curfew will began on November 19 and was set to last for 21 days. On December 7, DeWine announced that the curfew would be extended. On December 10, Governor DeWine extended the curfew until January 2. Also on December 10, DeWine unveiled the  Stay Safe Ohio protocol for the holiday season. On December 30, DeWine announced that he would extend the curfew until January 23. He also announced that schools would be allowed to resume full in-person learning on March 1. Students will be required to wear masks and social distance. On January 22, DeWine announced that he would extend the curfew until January 30. In early April, health orders were consolidated. Mass gatherings are permitted, so long as people stay in groups of 10 or less. On April 27, Governor DeWine announced that those who are fully vaccinated will not have to quarantine if exposed to a person with COVID.

Reopenings 
On April 14 DeWine said he couldn't imagine any businesses reopening without employees wearing masks. DeWine announced April 16 that some reopenings would start on May 1. On April 16, Trump announced that states could restart their economies when they had 14 days of declining cases.

On April 27, the governor announced Phase 1 of the state's reopening plan. The businesses allowed to reopen would be on this schedule:
 Friday, May 1: Hospital, medical, dental, and veterinary services that don't require an overnight hospital stay.
 Monday, May 4: Construction, distribution, manufacturing, and general offices 
 Tuesday, May 12: Consumer, retail, and service businesses

The plan also listed those types of businesses that would not reopen, and a list of rules and guidelines, including mandatory face coverings worn at all times. DeWine later reversed the order requiring people to wear face masks in businesses, saying that it "went too far."

On May 7, DeWine announced that on Friday, May 15, barbershops and salons may re-open. Also on May 15, patio service can resume at bars and restaurants. Parties at restaurants and bars must have 10 people or less and must be separated by a physical barrier or six feet of space. Restaurants and bars can resume dine-in services on May 21.

On May 14, DeWine and Acton announced more re-opening dates. Campgrounds will open on May 21, horse racing will open on May 22, the Ohio Bureau of Motor Vehicles (BMV), gyms, fitness centers, pools, and sports leagues (only for sports involving limited or no contact) will open on May 26, and childcare centers will re-open on May 31. Personal services such as salons, spas, massage therapy, tattoo services, and piercing services re-opened on May 15. On May 21, Lt. Governor Husted announced that bowling alleys, miniature golf, and batting cages can reopen May 26, so long as they follow certain protocols. He also announced that wedding venues and banquet halls may open on June 1 with the following restrictions: there must be six feet between tables; no congregating is allowed, and crowds can have no more than 300 people. Child care providers and day camps were allowed to re-open on May 31. Starting June 8, assisted living facilities and intermediate care facilities for people with developmental disabilities will allow outside visitation. On June 5 DeWine announced that entertainment facilities such as movie theaters and zoos may re-open in one week and that casinos, racinos, amusement parks, water parks, and outdoor theaters could reopen in two weeks. DeWine's office will approve a safety plan which will allow the Memorial Tournament to be held from July 13–19. Practice for contact sports can begin on June 22. DeWine announced on June 30 that nursing homes will be open for outdoor visitation starting July 20. On July 2 DeWine released guidelines for schools to follow as they re-open. They include: Vigilantly assessing for symptoms; Washing and sanitizing hands; Clean and sanitizing schools thoroughly;
Social distancing; And implementing face covering policies. In August, the Ohio Department of Health Director introduced a mask mandate for students in K-12 schools. In the fall of 2020, school sports are allowed, but with limited spectators. On September 23, DeWine issued an order allowing restaurants to fully open but with restrictions. Relaxed visitations at nursing homes and assisted living facilities will be allowed starting October 12. On January 26, Governor DeWine announced the criteria for lifting the 10 p.m. curfew. On January 27, DeWine announced that, starting January 28, the stateside curfew would start at 11 p.m. On February 11, the curfew was lifted.

On May 12, DeWine announced that all COVID health orders, including the mask mandate, would be lifted on June 2. On May 14, DeWine announced that the remaining health orders would be updated to reflect changes in the CDC's guidelines. Starting May 17, an amended health order allows fully vaccinated people to not wear masks. On June 1, Ohio Department of Health Director Stephanie McCloud signed an order rescinding several COVID-19-related health orders, including mask mandates. The rescissions went into effect on June 2.

Effectiveness of government response 
On March 26 Acton said that the measures implemented in Ohio had decreased the impact on the state's healthcare system by 50 to 75%. On March 27, Acton projected Ohio cases to peak in mid-May at 10,000 per day. By the first week in April, crediting Ohioan's compliance with social distancing requests, she had revised the projection to mid-to-late April or early May. On April 8, Acton said that the effectiveness of physical distancing being incorporated into modeling led to a revised projection of a new peak of 1,600 new cases per day in late April.

The Washington Post on April 9 said Ohio "was realizing the benefits of early intervention in the pandemic by its government and medical community," with fewer than 1/3 as many cases and "a small fraction of the deaths" as Illinois, Pennsylvania, and Michigan, all nearby comparably-sized states.

On October 24, President Trump held a campaign rally at the Pickaway County Fairgrounds in Circleville. "The seats were just inches apart in rows spaced less than 3 feet apart. The many more standees were packed closely together. The use of face masks was sporadic at best." President Trump told the crowd, "It's going away, it's rounding the turn." However, according to WBNS-TV in Columbus, "cases, hospitalizations and ICU admissions ... [had] increased in recent weeks." An amended health order signed in April mandates six feet of separation between tables at eating establishments that are not separated by physical barriers. The new order also states that social distancing, congregating, and capacity requirements do not apply to First Amendment activity and religious observances.

Criticism of government response

While multiple media outlets praised DeWine and Acton's orders, a group of 75 protested the restrictions on nonessential workers outside the Statehouse during their April 9 press conference. Another protest was staged April 13, reporters commenting that the protesters could be heard and were "pounding on the windows" during the press conference. On April 14, 100 protesters gathered at the Statehouse during DeWine's press conference.

On April 18 several hundred protesters again assembled at the Statehouse. Two men at the protest had a sign with anti-semitic imagery, showing a rat wearing a yarmulke and a Star of David with the caption, "The real plague." Protests continued on April 20 with hundreds gathering outside the Statehouse. On May 1, another large protest occurred during DeWine's press conference. Protests at the statehouse continued the next day.

On April 16, 2020, a Columbus bridal shop owner, represented by the 1851 Center for Constitutional Law, sued Acton for violating the shop owner's constitutional rights because of the stay-at-home order provided "no meaningful post-closure process built into it to determine whether a business is 'essential' and can re-open" and asking that the court for a "temporary restraining order that requires the state to provide an immediate hearing for a business closed by the government, in which officials must specifically say why a business is not essential."

In late April, 32 Ohio state representative Republicans called for DeWine to reopen the state's economy completely on May 1. In August, several Republicans filed an impeachment resolution that alleges that Dewine: gave Ohio's health department overly broad leeway to issue COVID-19 guidelines; "conspired" with the Ohio secretary of state to delay the March primary; and forced businesses to close, leading to a major economic slowdown. On September 28, Representative John Becker filed to have criminal charges brought against DeWine for his response to COVID-19. The criminal charges include engaging in a pattern of corrupt activity, complicity, terrorism, making terroristic threats, inducing panic, conspiracy, bribery, interfering with civil rights, coercion, and patient abuse or neglect.

On September 8, attendees at a Women for Trump event in Westerville featuring South Dakota Governor Christie Noem criticized Ohio Governor DeWine's handling of the pandemic. Noem, whose state had a 22% positivity rate, "described how she disdained a push by state health officials to require masks, limit business activities and take other actions to halt the spread of COVID-19." The Ohio Democratic Party questioned whether Noem had followed "the guidance of Mike DeWine's health department" requiring self-quarantine for 14 days for visitors from states with high positivity.

On September 21, at a Trump campaign rally in Swanton, Lieutenant Governor Jon Husted urged rally attendees to wear masks and was booed by the crowd. Governor DeWine was received with a mixture of cheers and boos. President Trump's speech described the disparate impact of the virus on the elderly and on the young, saying: "It affects elderly people. Elderly people with heart problems and other problems. If they have other problems, that's what it really affects. That's it." He concluded, "Take your hat off to the young because they have a hell of an immune system. But it affects virtually nobody. It's an amazing thing." The use of the phrase "it affects virtually nobody," on a day when Ohio had reached a total of over 9,318 cases among children, prompted criticism of the President's rhetoric on the virus.

On October 21, in an interview in The Hill, an Ohio farmer described how his advocacy group, Rural America 2020, is putting up billboards that read "Trump COVID superspreader event" with an arrow near campaign rallies. He said, "super spreader events ... are scaring the dickens out of folks in rural areas."

Primary elections 
Ohio's 2020 primary elections were scheduled to be held Tuesday, March 17. DeWine, Acton, and Secretary of State Frank LaRose held an afternoon press conference on Monday, March 16 to cover precautions being taken for the next day's primary election. LaRose issued an order to county boards of election allowing curbside voting.

DeWine recommended pushing the primaries into June but did not think he had the authority to change the date. DeWine and LaRose sought a court order to close down the elections, having former Ohio Department of Aging Director Judith Brachman file a suit in the Franklin County Court of Common Pleas to delay the election, but Judge Richard A. Frye denied it, saying it would set a "terrible precedent" and would represent a judge rewriting election code hours before an election.

Acton, who according to the Columbus Dispatch "has enormous powers during a health emergency", eventually announced at 10:08 pm that polls would be closed as a "health emergency." DeWine announced that LaRose would "seek a remedy through the courts to extend voting options so that every voter who wants to vote will be granted that opportunity."

Acting on behalf of a candidate for a Wood County Common Pleas judgeship, Corey Spiewak, Perrysburg attorney Andy Mayle filed a suit in the Ohio Supreme Court to overturn Acton's action. The court ordered the state to respond to the suit by 1:30 am Tuesday, saying that "Due to exigent circumstances, this matter will be decided on the complaint and answer. No requests or stipulations for extension of time shall be filed, and the clerk of the court shall refuse to file any requests or stipulations for extension of time. Ohio Attorney General Dave Yost and Solicitor General Benjamin M. Flowers filed an answer on behalf of LaRose. A decision denying the writ was issued by four justices. The three who did not participate in the decision were Judith French and Sharon Kennedy, both of whom were running for re-election, and Pat DeWine, who is the governor's son.

Private sector response 

In late March Battelle Labs in Columbus developed a technology to sterilize N95 masks for reuse, intending to provide 160,000 masks per day in Ohio and to send sterilizing machines to other areas of the US. On March 29 the FDA approved the technology for limited use of up to 10,000 sterilizations per day. DeWine issued a press release condemning this decision that afternoon. Later on March 29, the FDA changed their position, and allowed full use of the technology.

Amish businesses switched to producing face masks and shields. Berlin Gardens in Millersburg, normally a maker of garden furniture, was producing 100,000 face shields per day by April 10.

Gojo Industries announced that it would prioritize hospitals and first responders for its Purell hand sanitizer.

On September 9, trials for an potential COVID-19 vaccine at the Ohio State University Wexner Medical Center were put on hold because a UK participant developed an unexplained illness. The vaccine, developed by the University of Oxford and pharmaceutical company AstraZeneca, was going into clinical trials for 30,000 participants worldwide, with 500 participants at the Ohio State location.

Readiness 

According to Acton, as of March 24 Ohio had 3600 ICU beds and would need to increase that capacity by 50%. In Ohio about 26% of patients require hospitalization and about 11% need intensive care. As of March 24, Ohio hospitals were at 60% of capacity. In southwest Ohio, hospital executives said they could increase capacity by 20% to 50%.

Acton said on March 24 that Ohio was converting anesthesia machines to respirators, considering which other buildings could be converted into makeshift hospitals, and determining how to safely reuse personal protective equipment such as masks.

On October 15, it was reported that regional oubreaks had strained the hospital system in Lima.

Impacts 
The coronavirus pandemic affected abortion, employment, education, religion, the restaurant industry, sports, public transportation, and prisons in Ohio.

On abortion 

On March 17, after Acton issued an order prohibiting nonessential surgeries to preserve personal protective equipment (PPE), DeWine said abortions should be included except when the pregnant woman's life is at risk. Deputy Attorney General Jonathan Fulkerson sent letters to three abortion providers to compel them to comply with the state ban on nonessential medical procedures. District Court Judge Michael Barrett ruled in favor of Planned Parenthood on April 1, ordering a two-week suspension of the ban. The State of Ohio appealed Barrett's decision and asked him to put a hold on his order until the appeal was decided, which he declined to do. State of Ohio Attorney General Dave Yost later clarified that all medical abortions were still allowed, and that "doctors remain free to perform surgical abortions necessary for a mother's health or life, and also surgical abortions that cannot be delayed without jeopardizing the patient's abortion rights." On April 6, the State's request for an appeal was dismissed by the United States Court of Appeals for the Sixth Circuit.

On education 

On March 10 DeWine asked colleges and universities to go to remote classes. Within several days many private and public colleges and universities had announced campus closings and a move to online classes. On March 12 DeWine closed all K-12 schools starting March 16. On March 30 he extended those closings to May 1. On April 20, he ordered that all K-12 schools in the state remain closed for the rest of the 2019–2020 academic year  On May 6, Governor DeWine announced a $775 million budget reduction over the next two months. Spending on K-12 schools will be reduced by $300 million. Spending on other education will be reduced by $55 million and higher education spending will be reduced by $110 million.

On December 30, DeWine announced that he would extend the curfew until January 23. He also announced that schools would be allowed to resume full in-person learning on March 1. Students will be required to wear masks and social distance. DeWine also announced new looser guidelines for schools. COVID-19-exposed student are no longer required to quarantine at home, unless masking and social distancing cannot be enforced.

On employment 
NPR reported on March 24 that "Almost 140,000 people filed for unemployment benefits in Ohio last week compared with fewer than 5,000 a week earlier." On April 7, when asked about delays in the filing, Lieutenant Governor Husted said over 500 additional employees had been hired to process applications, bringing the number of employees of Ohio Department of Jobs and Family Services to 829 employees.

On prisons 

On April 8, the National Guard arrived at Elkton Federal Prison in Columbiana County to assist the medical staff when a large number of prisoners became ill with the virus. On April 18, the National Guard and Highway Patrol arrived at the state prison in Marion county to assist with "mission critical functions" after infections of correctional workers and prisoners. By April 19, over 1800 prisoners at Marion Correctional Institution, approximately 3/4ths of the population, plus 100 staff had tested positive. Overall the prison system had almost 2500 cases by April 19, representing almost a fifth of Ohio's cases. On April 20 Acton said the prison testing results were indicating that as many as 70% of cases may be asymptomatic.

On April 22, the Marion County prison was the top hotspot for the virus in the country, and the Pickaway Correctional Institution was second-ranked. Marion County was first in cases per capita in the nation, while Pickaway County was fourth. The Ohio prison system is designed to hold about 35,000 inmates but held about 49,000 in April 2020.

On April 22, federal judge James S. Gwin ordered Elkton prison to identify vulnerable inmates and transfer them from the facility. He ordered officials to "evaluate each subclass member's eligibility for transfer out of Elkton through any means, including but not limited to compassionate release, parole or community supervision, transfer furlough or non-transfer furlough within two weeks." He noted, "with the shockingly limited available testing and the inability to distance inmates, COVID-19 is going to continue to spread, not only among the inmate population but also among the staff." He condemned the Federal Department of Corrections, asking "Why has the Justice Department allocated Elkton an entirely insignificant number of tests while Ohio has been able to pull off mass testing across not only Marion but at multiple institutions?"

On May 19, Gwin ordered federal prison officials to begin the process of releasing eligible inmates at Elkton into home confinement for health and safety reasons. He said that "by thumbing their nose at their authority to authorize home confinement, (prison officials) threaten staff and they threaten low-security inmates." By that date, nine inmates had died from COVID-19. He ordered the release of 837 medically vulnerable prisoners, (those 65+ or with pre-existing conditions), to home confinement, compassionate release, or to provide detailed reasons for the denial. He also chided the prison for slow progress in testing, noting that "despite the obvious need for rapid implementation for mass testing across the entire institution, they are only conducting tests on Mondays and Tuesdays."

The Marshall Project reported May 28, 2021, that 135 state prisoners had died by that date, a rate of 28 per 100,000 prisoners. They reported 9,833 infections by that date, a rate of 20,100 per 100,000. 4,932 staff tested positive, and 10 died by the same date.

On public transportation 

In early March, as the pandemic began affecting Columbus, the city's public transit ridership began dropping, approximately 40 percent. Its public transit agency COTA began by introducing thorough cleaning measures, followed by reducing several rush-hour services on March 17. On March 19, it suspended fare collection, making all rides temporarily free, and required passengers to board and depart buses from the rear doors. On the same day, it also modified all rush-hour lines and suspended its AirConnect and Night Owl services. On March 20, the agency recommended only using its services for essential travel; two days later it shut down several rush-hour services and reduced frequencies of nine crosstown lines. On March 24, it stopped all rush-hour services until further notice. On March 26, the agency began "dynamic service" to pick up customers left at bus stops by too-full buses; the agency's current policy is for a maximum of 20 passengers per bus.

By April 11, the Toledo Area Regional Transit Authority began requiring riders to wear face coverings.

On religion 

The bishops of the Catholic Conference of Ohio suspended all public Masses in Ohio beginning March 16, dispensing with the obligation to attend Sunday Mass initially through Easter. On April 28, the suspension of mass and dispensation was extended through May 29. On May 8, the bishops announced the resumption of daily public Masses on May 25, with the dispensation continuing indefinitely.

The Genoa Baptist Church of Westerville, Ohio, switched to a drive-in format. The Bishop of the East Ohio Conference of the United Methodist Church urged the temporary closing of Methodist churches. Ohio's Amish steering committee advised all church districts to heed the state's orders against gatherings of more than 10, telling Amish "to cancel or postpone weddings, youth and family gatherings until further notice."

On the restaurant industry 

The closing of restaurants and bars affected 22,000 restaurants across the state and 500,000 workers. In March 2020 a group of Cincinnati restaurateurs called on the federal government to provide a $225 billion bailout to the US restaurant industry.

On sports 

Most of state's sports teams were affected. Several leagues began postponing or suspending their seasons starting 12 March. Major League Baseball cancelled the remainder of spring training on that date, and on March 16, they announced that the season will be postponed indefinitely, after the recommendations from the CDC to restrict events of more than 50 people for the next eight weeks, affecting the Cleveland Indians and Cincinnati Reds. Also on March 12, the National Basketball Association announced the season would be suspended for 30 days, affecting the Cleveland Cavaliers.  In the National Hockey League, the season was suspended for an indefinite amount of time, affecting the Columbus Blue Jackets.

In college sports, the National Collegiate Athletic Association cancelled all winter and spring tournaments, most notably the Division I men's and women's basketball tournaments, affecting colleges and universities statewide. On March 16, the National Junior College Athletic Association also canceled the remainder of the winter seasons as well as the spring seasons.

The Summit Motorsports Park announced they would ignore the stay-at-home order on April 16, and reopen for the 2020 season. At a panel held at the Ohio House of Representatives, the owner of the park testified his beliefs that the shutdown of businesses was more for political reasons than for health reasons, and that there was a nationwide mandate to mark every fatality in the United States of America as being caused by COVID-19.

On May 20, the Eldora Speedway owned by Tony Stewart, announced one of its largest events of the season would be rescheduled to June 2021 in accordance with the ongoing restrictions on mass gatherings and spectator sports at large venues. A decision on the dirt track's other major events was not announced.

See also
 COVID-19 pandemic in Columbus, Ohio
 Timeline of the COVID-19 pandemic in the United States
 COVID-19 pandemic in the United States – for impact on the country
 COVID-19 pandemic – for impact on other countries
 Ohio Vax-A-Million

References

External links

 
 Cincinnati Health Collaborative COVID-19 portal
 The Plain Dealer coronavirus coverage

 
Ohio
Coronavirus pandemic
coronavirus pandemic
Disasters in Ohio
Health in Ohio